Mungaoli tehsil is a fourth-order administrative and revenue division, a subdivision of third-order administrative and revenue division of Ashoknagar district of Madhya Pradesh.

Geography
Mungaoli tehsil has an area of 1211.58 sq kilometers. It is bounded by Ashoknagar tehsil in the southwest, west and northwest, Chanderi tehsil in the north, Uttarpradesh  in the northeast, Sagar district in the east and southeast and Vidisha district in the south.

See also 
Ashoknagar district

Citations

External links

Tehsils of Madhya Pradesh
Ashoknagar district